Adama Science and Technology University (ASTU) is a public university first established in 1993 as Nazareth Technical College (NTC) and one of the two Science And Technology Universities of Ethiopia. It is located in Adama, a city in the Oromia Region, Ethiopia.

Schools and Programs 
 School of Applied Natural Sciences Programs (4 year)
 Applied Biology   
 Applied Chemistry
 Applied Geology
 Applied Mathematics   
 Applied Physics 
 School of Civil Engineering and Architecture Programs (5 year)
 Architecture
 Civil Engineering
 Urban Planning and Design
 School of Electrical Engineering and Computing Programs (5 year)
 Computer Science and Engineering
 Electronics and Communication Engineering
 Electrical Power and control Engineering
 Software Engineering
 School of Mechanical, Chemical, and Materials Engineering Programs (5 year)
 Chemical Engineering
 Materials Science and Engineering  
 Mechanical Design and Manufacturing Engineering 
 Mechanical Systems Engineering 
 Thermal and Aerospace Engineering 
Source:

Research, Center of Excellence and Incubation Center 
 Advanced Manufacturing Engineering
 Advanced Material science and Engineering
 Transportation and vehicle engineering
 Advancement of electrical system and electronics, 
 Institute of pharmaceutical science
 Space Technology Institute
 Entrepreneurship Development Center (ASTU-EDC)

Sports

References

External links

 

Educational institutions established in 1993
Educational institutions established in 2005
1993 establishments in Ethiopia
2005 establishments in Ethiopia
Universities and colleges in Oromia Region